This is the discography for American jazz musician Oliver Nelson.

As leader/co-leader

Compilations

A Dream Deferred (Flying Dutchman 1969-75 [1976]) – Selections from Flying Dutchman albums  + 2 previously unreleased tracks
Back Talk (Chess, 1964 [1976]) with Lou Donaldson – Compilation of Argo & Cadet LPs Fantabulous and Rough House Blues
Images (Prestige 1961 [1976]) with Eric Dolphy – Compilation of Prestige LPs Screamin' the Blues and Straight Ahead
Three Dimensions (Impulse! 1961-66, [1978]) – Compilation of Impulse! LPs The Blues and the Abstract Truth and Sound Pieces + 2 previously unreleased tracks
Black, Brown and Beautiful (Bluebird, 1970-75 [1989]) – reissue of Johnny Hodges Flying Dutchman LP 3 Shades of Blue + tracks from Oliver Edward Nelson in London with Oily Rags and Skull Session
Verve Jazz Masters 48 (Verve, 1962-67 [1995]) – Selections from Verve albums
The Argo, Verve and Impulse Big Band Studio Sessions (Mosaic, 1961-67 [2006])

Film and Television Scores

Dzjes Zien (1965) – Dutch Television Movie
Ironside (1967-1972) – US TV Series
Run for Your Life (1967) – US TV Series
The Name of the Game (1968-1970) – US TV Series
Death of a Gunfighter (1969) – US Movie
It Takes a Thief (1969-1970) – US TV Series
Zig Zag (1970) – US Movie
Dial Hot Line (1970) – US TV Movie
Skullduggery (1970) – US Movie
Matt Lincoln (1970) – US TV Series
Lady Sings the Blues (1971) – US Movie – arranger only
Longstreet (1971) – US TV Series
Night Gallery (1971-1972) – US TV Series
Cutter (1972) – US TV Series
Columbo (1972) – US TV Series
Last Tango in Paris (1972) – French/Italian Movie
Banacek (1973) – US TV Series
I Love a Mystery (1973) – US TV Movie
The Six Million Dollar Man (1973-1975) – US TV Series
Chase (1973) – US TV series
Casino on Wheels (1973) – US TV Movie
The Alpha Caper (1973) – US TV Movie
Money to Burn (1973) – US TV Movie
Matt Helm (1975) – US TV Series
The Bionic Woman (1976) – US TV Series

As arranger/conductor 
An additional sideman role may be present in these recordings.
With Faye Adams
 "You Can Trust In Me"/"Goodnight My Love"' (Prestige, 1962) – 7inch SP

With Cannonball Adderley
 Domination (Capitol, 1965)

With Steve Allen 
Soulful Brass #2 (Flying Dutchman, 1969)

With Air Pocket
 Fly On (East Wind, 1975) – producer

With Louis Armstrong
 Louis Armstrong and His Friends (Flying Dutchman/Amsterdam, 1971) – recorded in 1970

With Gato Barbieri
 Last Tango in Paris (United Artists, 1973) – recorded in 1972
 El Gato (Flying Dutchman, 1975) – recorded in 1972

With Elek Bacsik
 Bird and Dizzy: A Musical Tribute (Flying Dutchman, 1975) – arranger, conductor

With James Brown
 Soul on Top (King, 1970) – recorded in 1969

With Mel Brown
Chicken Fat (Impulse!, 1967)
With Ray Brown and Milt Jackson
Ray Brown / Milt Jackson (Verve, 1965)
With Ruth Brown 
"Secret Love"/"Time After Time" (Noslen, 1963)
With Henry Cain
The Funky Organ-ization Of Henry Cain (Capitol, 1967)
With Betty Carter
'Round Midnight (Atco, 1963)
With Ray Charles
A Portrait of Ray (ABC/Tangerine, 1968)
With Lou Donaldson
Rough House Blues (Cadet, 1964)
With Jean DuShon
Feeling Good (Cadet, 1966)
With Lorraine Ellison
Heart & Soul (Warner Bros., 1966)
With Art Farmer
Listen to Art Farmer and the Orchestra (Mercury, 1962)
With Maynard Ferguson
Come Blow Your Horn (Cameo, 1964)
With Don Goldie
Trumpet Exodus (Verve, 1962)
With Leo Gooden
Leo Sings with Strings (L.G., 1963)
With Jackie and Roy
Changes (Verve, 1966)

With Jimmy Grissom
"I've Got You On My Mind"/"Lover's Reverie" (Prestige, 1962)

With Nobuo Hara and His Sharps & Flats
 3-2-1-0 (Nippon Columbia, 1969)

With Johnny Hartman
I Love Everybody (ABC-Paramount, 1967)

With Johnny Hodges
The Eleventh Hour (Verve, 1962)
3 Shades of Blue (Flying Dutchman, 1970)
With Richard Holmes
Six Million Dollar Man (RCA/Flying Dutchman, 1975)
With Paul Horn
Monday, Monday (RCA Victor, 1966)
 Paul Horn & The Concert Ensemble (Ovation, 1969)
With Paul Humphrey, Shelly Manne, Willie Bobo & Louie Bellson
The Drum Session (Philips (Japan), 1974) – producer
With Yujiro Ishihara
Nostalia (Teichiku Entertainment (Japan), 1974)
With Etta Jones
So Warm (Prestige, 1961)
With Kimiko Kasai
Kimiko Kasai in Person (CBS/Sony (Japan), 1973)
Thanks, Dear (CBS/Sony (Japan), 1974) – musical supervisor
With Ramsey Lewis
Country Meets the Blues (Argo, 1962); reeds only
With Herbie Mann
My Kinda Groove (Atlantic, 1964)
Latin Mann (Columbia, 1965)
Today! (Atlantic, 1965)
Our Mann Flute (Atlantic, 1966)
With Lloyd G. Mayers
A Taste of Honey (United Artists Jazz, 1962)
With Carmen McRae
Portrait of Carmen (Atlantic, 1967)
With Thelonious Monk
Monk's Blues (Columbia, 1968)
With Wes Montgomery
Goin' Out of My Head (Verve, 1965)
With Lee Morgan
Delightfulee (Blue Note, 1966)
With Esther Phillips
Esther Phillips Sings (Atlantic, 1955)
With Della Reese 
"Every Other Day"/"Soon" (ABC, 1967)
I Gotta Be Me...This Trip Out (ABC, 1968)
With Irene Reid
Room for One More (Verve, 1965)
With Buddy Rich
Swingin' New Big Band (Pacific Jazz, 1966); 8 tracks

The New One! (Pacific Jazz, 1967); one track only
Rich in London (RCA, 1971); one track only
With Sonny Rollins
Alfie (Impulse!, 1966)
With Diana Ross
Lady Sings the Blues (Motown, 1972)
Blue (Motown, 1972)
With Jimmy Rushing 
Every Day I Have the Blues (BluesWay, 1967)
With Shirley Scott
For Members Only (Impulse!, 1963)
Great Scott!! (Impulse!, 1964)
Roll 'Em: Shirley Scott Plays the Big Bands (Impulse!, 1966)
With Doc Severinsen
Rhapsody for Now! (RCA, 1973)
With Bud Shank 
Girl in Love (World Pacific, 1966)
With Jimmy Smith
Bashin': The Unpredictable Jimmy Smith (Verve, 1962)Hobo Flats (Verve, 1963)Who's Afraid of Virginia Woolf? (Verve, 1964)Monster (Verve, 1965)Got My Mojo Workin' (Verve, 1965)Peter & the Wolf (Verve, 1966)Hoochie Coochie Man (Verve, 1966)Jimmy & Wes: The Dynamic Duo (Verve, 1966) with Wes MontgomeryFurther Adventures of Jimmy and Wes (Verve, 1966) with Wes MontgomeryLivin' It Up! (Verve, 1968)
With Ringo StarrSentimental Journey (Apple, 1969)
With Carl StokesThe Mayor and the People (Flying Dutchman, 1970)
With Billy TaylorRight Here, Right Now!  (Capitol Records, 1963)Midnight Piano (Capitol, 1964)
With Jack TeagardenJack Teagarden (Verve, 1962)
With The Temptations The Temptations in a Mellow Mood (Gordy, 1967)
With Clark TerryClark Terry Plays the Jazz Version of All American (Moodsville, 1962)
With Bob ThieleI Saw Pinetop Spit Blood (Flying Dutchman, 1975) 
With Leon ThomasThe Leon Thomas Album (Flying Dutchman, 1970)Leon Thomas in Berlin (Flying Dutchman, 1971)
With The Three SoundsColdwater Flat (Blue Note, 1968)
With Cal TjaderSoul Burst (Verve, 1966)
With Stanley TurrentineJoyride (Blue Note, 1965)
With Joe WilliamsJump for Joy (RCA Victor, 1963)Me and the Blues (RCA Victor, 1964)
With Nancy WilsonHow Glad I Am (Capitol, 1964)Today, My Way (Capitol, 1964)A Touch of Today (Capitol, 1966)Just for Now (Capitol, 1966)Lush Life (Capitol, 1967)Welcome to My Love (Capitol, 1967)
With Kai WindingSuspense Themes in Jazz (Verve, 1962)More Brass (Verve, 1966)

As arranger and sideman
With Gene AmmonsSoul Summit Vol. 2 (Prestige, 1961 [1962]; arranged two tracks)Late Hour Special (Prestige, 1961 [1964]; arranged 4 tracks)Velvet Soul (Prestige, 1961 [1964]; arranged 1 track)
With Count BasieAfrique (Flying Dutchman, 1970); also tenor saxophone
With Eddie "Lockjaw" DavisTrane Whistle (Prestige, 1960); also alto saxophone
With Jimmy ForrestSoul Street (New Jazz, 1962); tenor saxophone on one track
With Etta JonesFrom the Heart (Prestige, 1962); alto saxophone on 4 tracks
With Frank WessSouthern Comfort (Prestige, 1962); also tenor saxophone
With Lem WinchesterLem's Beat (Prestige, 1960); also tenor saxophone

Credited as sideman only
With Cannonball AdderleyAfrican Waltz (Riverside, 1961)
With Manny AlbamJazz Goes to the Movies (Impulse!, 1962)
With Elek BacsikI Love You (Bob Thie, 1973)
With Louie BellsonThe Brilliant Bellson Sound (Verve, 1959)
With Clea BradfordThese Dues (Tru-Sound, 1961)
With Chris ConnorFree Spirits (Atlantic, 1962)Richard Rodgers' No Strings: An After-Theatre Version (Atlantic, 1962) with Bobby Short
With Duke EllingtonParis Blues (United Artists, 1962)
With Red GarlandSoul Burnin' (Prestige, 1961)Rediscovered Masters (Prestige 1961 [1977])
With Etta JonesSomething Nice (Prestige, 1960 [1961])Hollar! (Prestige, 1960 [1963])
With J. J. JohnsonJ.J.! (RCA Victor, 1964) – reeds
With Quincy JonesI Dig Dancers (Mercury, 1960)The Quintessence (Impulse!, 1961)The Pawnbroker (Mercury, 1965)
With Louis Jordan
"If You're So Smart How Come You Ain't Rich"/"How Blue Can You Get" (Decca, 1951)
"Please Don't Leave Me"/"Three-Handed Woman" (Decca, 1951)
"Trust in Me"/"Cock-a-Doodle Doo"/"Work Baby Work" (Decca, 1951)
"May Every Day Be Christmas"/"Bone Dry" (Decca, 1951)
"Louisville Lodge Meeting"/"Work Baby Work" (Decca, 1951)
"Slow Down" (Decca, 1951 [1952])
"Fat Sam from Birmingham" (Decca, 1951 [1953])
"There Must Be a Way" (Decca, 1951 [1953])
"Come And Get It" (Decca, 1951 [1954])
With Eddie KirklandIt's the Blues Man! (Tru-Sound, 1962)
With Mundell Lowe
Satan in High Heels (soundtrack) (Charlie Parker, 1961)
With Gary McFarlandThe Jazz Version of "How to Succeed in Business without Really Trying" (Verve, 1961)
With Joe NewmanJoe Newman Quintet at Count Basie's (Mercury, 1961)
With Shirley ScottBlue Seven (Prestige, 1961)
With Johnny "Hammond" SmithTalk That Talk (New Jazz, 1960)
With Leon ThomasLeon Thomas in Berlin (Flying Dutchman, 1970)Gold Sunrise on Magic Mountain'' (Mega/Flying Dutchman, 1971)

References 

Discographies of American artists
Jazz discographies